Andrew David Llewellyn (born 26 February 1966) is an English former professional footballer who made more than 300 appearances in the Football League and represented England at youth level. He played as a right back.

Career
Born in Bristol, Llewellyn played for Bristol City, Exeter City, Hereford United and Yeovil Town.

References

1966 births
Living people
Footballers from Bristol
English footballers
England youth international footballers
Association football defenders
Bristol City F.C. players
Exeter City F.C. players
Hereford United F.C. players
Yeovil Town F.C. players
English Football League players